The Pasadena Unified School District is a unified school district that is responsible for the schools of Pasadena, California. , it has four high schools, five middle schools, three K–8 schools and 15 K–5 elementary schools. The number of elementary schools was reduced from 18 at the end of the 2010–11 school year. The district also serves the city of Sierra Madre and the unincorporated community of Altadena.

PUSD is run by a board of education, whose members serve four-year terms.  Duties of the board include budgeting, approving expenditures, establishing policy, making employment decisions, approving textbooks and courses of study, and approving academic initiatives.  As of June 2012, PUSD's at-large board districts became geographic subdistricts.  As of December 12, 2022, the members of the PUSD Board of Education are Kimberly Kenne (District 1), Jennifer Hall Lee (District 2), Michelle Richardson Bailey (District 3), Patrick Cahalan (District 4), Patrice Marshall McKenzie (District 5), Tina Wu Fredericks (District 6) and Yarma Velázquez (District 7).

History

In its early history, Pasadena had some of the highest performing schools in the state, largely due to a strong affiliation with the California Institute of Technology. Two schools in the area, Noyes Elementary (now closed) and Hale Elementary (now Norma Coombs Elementary School), were named after Caltech professors.

In January 1970, as supplemented in March 1970, desegregation busing was ordered in the district after the federal court ordered desegregation of the public schools in Pasadena. This was a result of the city demographics of the time, which resulted in a "de facto" segregation, with a large proportion of the African American population attending schools in the northwest area of the city (which was largely African American), and the white students attending schools in the east and southern parts.

Before the busing plan was implemented in September 1970, the proportion of white students in public schools reflected the proportion of whites in the community (54 percent and 53 percent, respectively).  Shortly after busing began, a significant segment of upper- and middle-class families that could afford private schooling pulled their children out of the public school system.  The result was a boom of private schooling available in the city, and a reduction of state funding for Pasadena public schools as enrollment was reduced.

The PUSD also hosted an "alternative" school in the early 1970s: the Evening High School. First envisioned for students that had to work during the daytime to support their families, the school was quickly populated with students who were disenchanted with the schooling experience at other Pasadena High Schools such as Pasadena High, Muir and Blair.  Evening High was located on the campus of Blair High and operated in the evening hours between 4 and 9. Paul Finot was the man behind the idea that originated from his time in POW camps during the Korean War. A group of people need to self-organize to succeed. Finot transformed his experience in the camps into a high school environment where every student was encouraged to govern their school and environment.

In 2002, Superintendent Percy Clark reduced the number of students bused in the district and expanded a policy of neighborhood schools.

By 2004 Pasadena was home to sixty-three private schools, which educated one-third of all school-aged children in the city, and the proportion of white students in the public schools had fallen to 16 percent.  One current (as of 2014) board member, Renatta Cooper, has stated that Pasadena has more private schools per capita than any city its size in the United States.

By 2006, Allendale, Edison, Linda Vista, and Noyes elementary schools closed in 2008, such as Edison Elementary is now replaced with Focus Point Academy, a Special Education school, while Allendale was used as a temporary site for Blair IB Magnet Middle School students while the new middle school campus was under construction.

For the 2009–2010 school year, Pasadena Unified mounted a drive to stop interdistrict transfers out of the district. This was mainly directed at children entering kindergarten, first, seventh, and ninth grades, citing these as "transition" years. They included first grade as a transition year because kindergarten is not required by the State of California.

For the 2011-2012 school year, Blair International Baccalaureate School opened a new middle school campus.

By the start of the 2015–2016 school year, Sierra Madre Middle School opened a brand new campus, which will increase the number of middle schools to four, and Don Benito Fundamental and Norma Coombs Alternative Schools will now become neighborhood elementary schools, while Field Elementary becomes a Mandarin DLIP (Dual Language Immersion Program) and San Rafael Elementary become a Spanish Dual Language Immersion Program.

Starting in 2013, school board members will be elected by geographical districts, which replaces a seat number and at large, with the primary/runoff format, similar to the Pasadena City Council, there are seven geographical districts, Districts 1, 3, 5, and 7 starting with the 2013 elections, while Districts 2, 4, and 6 starting with the 2015 elections, thanks to a ballot measure passage by the voters during the 2012 California Primary election. Voters in the Pasadena Unified School District voted during the June 2018 election to extend the terms of the seven School Board members to an additional 19 months, with Districts 2, 4 and 6 effective with the November 2020 election and Districts 1, 3, 5 and 7 with the November 2022 election. The elections are replaced with the plurality format instead of the primary/runoff format effective in November 2020.

Starting in 2015–16 school year, high school attendance boundaries had changes: Blair International Baccalaureate School is serving downtown and southwest Pasadena, while John Muir High School is serving northwest Pasadena and the Linda Vista neighborhood as well as the western portion of Altadena, and Pasadena High School  is serving the eastern portion of Altadena, Sierra Madre, as well as the central, eastern, and southeastern portions of Pasadena.

In 2012, the district was the subject a 90-minute documentary film titled Go Public. The documentary was filmed by 50 crews following the stories of various people in 28 schools for one day, intended to portray the positive and negative realities in a moderate-sized public education system.

Elementary schools
 Altadena Elementary School
 Don Benito Fundamental School
 Field Elementary School (offers Mandarin Dual Language Immersion Program)
 Hamilton Elementary School
 Jackson Elementary School
 Longfellow Elementary School
 Madison Elementary School
 McKinley School (K-8)
 Norma Coombs Alternative School
 San Rafael Elementary School (offers Spanish Dual Language Immersion Program)
 Sierra Madre Elementary School (K-5)
 Washington Accelerated Elementary
 Webster Elementary School
 Willard Elementary School (offers International Baccalaureate Program)

Closed elementary schools
 Audubon Primary School (1989)
 Allendale Elementary School (2006)
 Edison Elementary School (2006)
 Linda Vista Elementary School (2006)
 Noyes Elementary School (2006)
 Burbank Elementary School (2011)
 Loma Alta Elementary School (2011)
 Cleveland Elementary School (2019)
 Franklin Elementary School (2019)
 Jefferson Elementary School (2019)
 Roosevelt Elementary School (2019)

In November 2010 the PUSD board voted to close Burbank Elementary School and Loma Alta Elementary School in the Altadena area. In 2011 PUSD discussed the possibility of relocating a special-needs preschool and several nonprofit organizations to the Burbank campus.

Middle schools
 Blair Middle School — Zoned - grades 6-8
 Charles W. Eliot Middle School - Zoned — grades 6-8
 Octavia Butler Middle School- Zoned - grades 6-8
 Sierra Madre Middle School - zoned - grades 6-8

In 2019, the Pasadena Board of Education voted 4-3 to close Woodrow Wilson Middle School at the end of the 2019-20 school year. In 2022, Washington Middle School was renamed as Octavia Butler Middle School.

High schools
 John Muir High School — Zoned, grades 9-12
 Pasadena High School — Zoned, grades 9-12
 Rose City High School — Continuation High School
 Center for Independent Study - Independent Studies

6-12 schools
 Marshall Fundamental Secondary School — Alternative, grades 6-12 (middle and high school)
 Blair International Baccalaureate School — Zoned, grades 6-12

Enrollment and staffing
In the 2009–2010 school year PUSD served 20,084 students, a drop of approximately 14% since the 2000–2001 school year, when enrollment during the past fifteen years peaked at 23,559 students. As of the 2013–2014 school year, enrollment had dropped to 19,102 students.
As of the 2009–2010 school year, PUSD employed 1,154 certificated staff, 1,027 of which were teachers.
In 2009–2010, the district also employed 1,307 classified personnel, 955 of which were full-time, 352 part-time.

Curriculum
Every PUSD elementary student receives daily instruction in English Language Arts using the Balanced Literacy for language arts program. Middle and high schools use the Holt Literature and Language Arts curriculum.  The PUSD Math curriculum is based on California's mathematics framework which includes the Houghton Mifflin Mathematics curriculum for elementary schools and additional college-prep classes beginning in eighth grade.  Curricular focus is also placed on History, Math, Social Studies, Science, Foreign language, Art and Music, and Physical Education.

References

External links

 
List of PUSD schools
Greatschools Page

 
School districts in Los Angeles County, California
Altadena, California
Sierra Madre, California
1874 establishments in California
School districts established in 1874